is a Japanese delinquent manga series written and illustrated by Hiroshi Takahashi. It has the same setting as Takahashi's previous manga Crows and QP and revolves around a group of teenage boys who fight their way through the notorious high school Suzuran.

The manga was first published by Monthly Shōnen Champion in 2001. The series is currently being serialized in Japan and has been collected into twenty-five tankōbon volumes. In North America, Digital Manga Publishing has released only three volumes, with the last graphic novel released in November 2004.

Hiroshi Takahashi had also released Worst Gaiden, which is the short collection of sides stories for the Worst series.

Plot

Hana Tsukishima is a country boy who recently moved to city. He is a good guy, ingenuous and honest, but he is also very strong. His goal is to become the leader of Suzuran High. He and his friends encounter and fight many other gangs and rival schools, led by clan-logic and strength hierarchy.

Volume listing

Reception
As of 15 January 2012, volume 28 has sold more than 200,000 copies.

References

External links
 Official Digital Manga Publishing Worst website
 

2001 manga
Akita Shoten manga
Digital Manga Publishing titles
Shōnen manga
Yankī anime and manga